William Holman (by 1524 – 1559/1569), of Dorchester and Berwick, Dorset, was an English politician.

He was a Member (MP) of the Parliament of England for Dorchester in October 1553 and 1559.

References

16th-century deaths
Members of the Parliament of England for Dorchester
Year of birth uncertain
English MPs 1553 (Mary I)
English MPs 1559